Plenocaris plena is a Cambrian arthropod with a bivalved carapace, and is known from the Burgess shale and Chengjiang. Originally described as a species of Yohoia by Walcott in 1912, it was placed into its own genus in 1974. 

The head has a pair of simple antennae. The body has 13 tergites, with trunk tergites 2 to 4 having pairs of elongate and uniramous appendages, with appendages absent from the other body segments. The body terminates with paired tail flukes. unlike waptiids, but similar to Synophalos, the tail flukes lack segmentation. 106 specimens of Plenocaris are known from the Greater Phyllopod bed, where they comprise 0.20% of the community. It has been suggested to be a member of Hymenocarina, which contains numerous other Cambrian bivalved arthropods.

References

Further reading

External links 
 
 Image of Plenocaris fossil

Burgess Shale fossils
Prehistoric arthropod genera
Cambrian genus extinctions

Hymenocarina